James, Jim, or Jimmy Butler may refer to:

Irish noblemen
James Butler, 1st Earl of Ormond (c. 1305–1338)
James Butler, 2nd Earl of Ormond (1331–1382)
James Butler, 3rd Earl of Ormond (c. 1359–1405)
James Butler, 4th Earl of Ormond (1392–1452)
James Butler, 5th Earl of Ormond (1420–1461)
Sir James Butler of Polestown (died 1487), warlord in Yorkist Ireland
James Butler, 9th Earl of Ormond (1496–1546)
James Butler of Duiske (fl. 1540–1576)
James Butler, 1st Duke of Ormond (1610–1688), Anglo-Irish statesman and soldier
James Butler, 2nd Duke of Ormonde (1665–1745), Irish statesman and soldier
James Butler (military adventurer) (fl. 1631–1634), Irish military adventurer
James Butler, 1st Marquess of Ormonde (1777–1838)
James Butler, 3rd Marquess of Ormonde (1844–1919), Irish nobleman
James Butler, 4th Marquess of Ormonde (1849–1943)
James Butler, 5th Marquess of Ormonde (1890–1949)
James Butler, 6th Marquess of Ormonde (1893–1971), British peer
James Butler, 7th Marquess of Ormonde (1899–1997)

Politics

U.S. politics
James Joseph Butler (1862–1917), U.S. Representative from Missouri
James Butler Hare (1918–1966), American politician
Jim Butler (Ohio politician) (born 1969), member of the Ohio House of Representatives
Jim Butler (West Virginia politician), member of the West Virginia House of Delegates

Other politics
James Butler (1651–1696), Member of Parliament for Arundel
James Butler (1680–1741), Member of Parliament for Arundel and Sussex
Sir J. R. M. Butler (James Ramsay Montagu Butler, 1889–1975), British politician and academic

Sports
James Butler (American football) (born 1982), American football safety
James Butler (boxer) (born 1972), American boxer
James Butler (Canadian football) (born 1995), Canadian football running back
James Butler (sprinter) (born 1960), American track sprinter
James Caron Butler (born 1980), American basketball player
Jim Butler (American football) (born 1943), American football running back
Jim Butler (table tennis) (born 1971), American table tennis player
Jimmy Butler (born 1989), American basketball player

Others
James Butler (artist) (1931–2022), British sculptor
James Butler (Bible scholar), Australian founder of Adelaide Bible Institute
James Butler (British Army officer) (died 1836)
James Butler (grocer) (1855–1934), American businessman
James Butler (Irish Brigade officer) (died 1770), officer in the Irish Brigade in France
James Bayley Butler (1884–1964), Irish biologist and academic
James Edward Butler (1843–1913), Justice of the peace, planter, and merchant in Alabama
James G. Butler (1920–2005), American trial lawyer
James "Gallda" Butler (died 1434)
Jim Butler (game designer), American role-playing game designer
Jimmy Butler (actor) (1921–1945), American actor